Pau Cin Hau is the founder and the name of a religion followed by some Tedim,  Hakha in Chin state and Kale in Sagaing division in the north-western part of Myanmar.

Pau Cin Hau was born in the Tedim (Tiddim) in 1859; and lived until 1948.  He started a religious movement based on the worship of a god known as "Pasian".

He also invented a script known as "Tual lai" ('local script') or "Zotuallai", now called "Zotuallai". There is logographic script based alphabet.

Pau Cin Hau's religion is also known as "Laipian" ('script religion'), and Pau Cin Hau is also known as "Laipianpa" ('script religion creator').

See also
Pau Cin Hau script

References

External links
ScriptSource page on the Pau Cin Hau alphabet

Burmese religious leaders
Founders of new religious movements
1859 births
1948 deaths